Skip bombing  was a low-level bombing technique independently developed by several of the combatant nations in World War II, notably Italy, Australia, Britain, Soviet Union and the United States. It allows an aircraft to attack shipping by skipping the bomb across the water like a stone.

As the technique required the aircraft to fly at very low altitudes directly at the ship, it made shooting down the aircraft easier as well. In the immediate pre-war era, there was considerable effort to develop new bombsights that would allow the aircraft to remain at higher altitudes. The most notable was the US Navy's Norden bombsight, which was fitted to most Navy aircraft. In practice, these proved largely useless, and the skip-bombing technique was soon introduced operationally.

After Pearl Harbor (December 1941), it was used prominently against Imperial Japanese Navy warships and transports by Major William Benn of the 63rd Squadron, 43rd Bomb Group (Heavy), Fifth Air Force, United States Army Air Forces in the Southwest Pacific area theater during World War II.  General George Kenney has been credited with being the first American to use skip bombing with the U.S. Army Air Forces.

Skip bombing was most famously used in Operation Chastise known as the Dambuster raid. This used specially designed bouncing bombs to skip along the water and destroy the dams.

Technique
They would release a "stick" of two to four bombs, usually  or  bombs preferably equipped with four- to five-second time delay fuzes. The bombs would "skip" over the surface of the water in a manner similar to stone skipping and either bounce into the side of the ship and detonate, submerge and explode next to the ship, or bounce over the target and miss. Unlike the Upkeep or Highball devices, this technique used standard bomb types, although only bombs with a generally hemispherical nose—as all regular American World War II general purpose aircraft bombs had—would bounce off the water surface properly.

In practice, the techniques were often combined: a bomber would drop two bombs, skipping the first and launching the second at mast height. The Battle of the Bismarck Sea would demonstrate the effectiveness of these low-level attacks on ships.

Aircraft
Various aircraft types were used for skip-bombing attacks, including B-17 Flying Fortress heavy bombers, B-25 Mitchell medium bombers, and A-20 Havoc attack bombers. These were supported by heavily armed Royal Australian Air Force Bristol Beaufighters, which would suppress Japanese antiaircraft fire with their machine guns and cannon. The Soviets used lend-leased A-20 Havocs and P-40 Tomahawks as well as Il-2 Sturmoviks (also used for air defence suppression). Skip bombers were often used by aviation of the Soviet Northern Fleet in combination with torpedo bombers (usually the same A-20 aircraft, skip bombers and torpedo bombers operated in pairs). Skip bombers were called "topmachtoviks" (топмачтовики) in Russian, because they were flying "at the level of ship mast tops".

Advantages and disadvantages
Skip bombing carried several advantages.  Unguided, unpowered bombs are vastly cheaper than torpedoes of equivalent explosive power.  Torpedoes take up to several minutes to reach their targets after launch, enough time for an agile ship with an attentive crew to turn and avoid the attack or minimize its damage; skipped bombs, however, reach their targets in seconds.  Skip bombing is additionally carried out at high speeds, increasing bombers' chances of surviving anti-aircraft fire as aerial torpedoes of the era were dropped at relatively low speeds.

The main drawback of skip bombing was that it took a great deal of skill to perfect; sometimes the bombs would detonate too soon, or in some cases, sink too deep before its delay-fuzed explosion.

History
The first use of low-altitude bombing in WWII properly belongs to the British. On September 4, 1939, 15 British Bristol Blenheim bombers assaulted a group of German vessels near Wilhelmshaven, Germany. These first efforts failed to sink the ships because the bombs had insufficient time to arm before impact. They did, however, demonstrate the precision of a low-altitude attack. The British continued to use low-altitude techniques and eventually began to incorporate skip bombing into their tactics.

Although historically, American skip bombing started with the prewar attack doctrine espoused by General George Kenney, practically, it began on August 26, 1941, when General Henry "Hap" Arnold, Chief of the Army Air Forces (US), heard details of a British skip bombing attack at an Allied conference in England. Upon his return from England, General Arnold charged developmental teams at Eglin Army Airfield, Florida with the task of creating an American version of skip bombing.

Major William Benn, General Kenney's aide, had witnessed some of the testing at Eglin during the summer of 1942. In July of that year, Kenney and Benn conducted their own ad hoc experiment in Nadi, Fiji on Kenney's way to take command of the Fifth Army Air Force based in Australia. In late September 1942, Major Benn, then commanding the 63d BS of the 43d Bombardment Group, was using a wrecked ship, sitting on a reef outside Port Moresby Harbor for skip bombing training.

By the time the Eglin Airfield test results were released in December 1942, Benn and the 63d BS, 43d BG, Fifth Army Air Force had already put low-altitude and skip bombing into practice. The first time skip bombing was used in action by U.S. pilots was against Japanese warships at Rabaul on New Britain on the night of October 22–23, 1942, where B-17 heavy bombers attacked and destroyed the enemy vessels. With the continuing success against shipping in Rabaul Harbor throughout October and November 1942, both the tactic and the term "skip bombing" had become popular in the Fifth Army Air Force. Another notable use of this technique was during the Battle of the Bismarck Sea, March 2–4, 1943, when aircraft of the U.S. Fifth Air Force and the Royal Australian Air Force (RAAF) attacked and largely destroyed a Japanese troop convoy off the northern coast of New Guinea.

See also
 Bouncing bomb
 Toss bombing
 Low Level Bombsight, Mark III

References

Citations

Bibliography 
 Biographies : General George Churchill Kenney. United States Air Force. Retrieved February 28, 2014.
 Development of Skip Bombing. 43rd Bomb Group (H), 5th AAF website. Retrieved 8 August 2010.
 
 
 Murphy, James T. (1993), Skip Bombing. Praeger Publishers. .
 Resume of Skip Bombing. Transcription (imperfect) of 1943 AAF document. 43rd Bomb Group (H), 5th AAF website. Retrieved 8 August 2010.
 
 Skip Bombing With Logs (1944). Air Force Magazine - The Official Service Journal of the US Army Air Forces, February 1944, p. 60. Retrieved 30 March 2022.
 Wawrzynski, Moroslaw (2005), Ju 87 in Foreign Service. Mushroom Model Magazine Special Red Series. .

External links
 AAF "Skip Bombers" Sweep Over Tree Tops To Score Bull's-Eye, May 1944, Popular Mechanics one of the first articles telling the general public in the US about skip-bombing
 Fifth U.S. Army Air Force in Australia 1942–1945
 Skip Bombing in WWIIF forum
 An anecdotal perspective on George Kenney and the Fifth Army Air Force in WWII Home of Heroes: Major Ralph Cheli
 Lessons Learned in Combat from Ken's Men: 43rd Bomb Group (H)
 Modified B25 Bombers Pioneered the Skip-Bombing Tactic (2015). WWII History Magazine, July 30, 2015. Retrieved 30 March 2022.
 B-25 Mitchell skip-bombs a Japanese Kaibokan escort ship, 1945 . Rarehistoricalphotos.com, updated Nov. 19, 2021. Retrieved 30 March 2022.

United States Air Force
Bombing